Elias Edström (born April 19, 1995) is a Swedish professional ice hockey player. He is currently playing with Tegs SK of the Hockeyettan (Div.1).

Edström made his Swedish Hockey League debut playing with Skellefteå AIK during the 2014–15 SHL season.

References

External links

1995 births
AIK IF players
Asplöven HC players
IF Troja/Ljungby players
Kristianstads IK players
Living people
Piteå HC players
Skellefteå AIK players
Swedish ice hockey forwards